The fifty-fifth edition of the Caribbean Series (Serie del Caribe) was played in 2013. 

The Series was held from February 1 through February 7, featuring the champion teams of the 2012–2013 season in the Dominican Winter League (Leones del Escogido), Mexican Pacific League (Yaquis de Obregón), Puerto Rican Professional Baseball League (Criollos de Caguas), and Venezuelan Professional Baseball League (Navegantes del Magallanes).

The format consisted of twelve games, in a double round-robin format with each team facing each other twice, while the championship game was played between the two best teams of the round robin. All of the games were played at Estadio Sonora in Hermosillo, Mexico.

Summary

Final standings

Individual leaders

All-Star team

Scoreboards

Game 1, February 1

Game 2, February 1

Game 3, February 2

Game 4, February 2

Game 5, February 3

Game 6, February 3

Game 7, February 4

Game 8, February 4

Game 9, February 5

Game 10, February 5

  * Tejada extended an all-time home run record (15) in the Series he already held.

Game 11, February 6

Game 12, February 6

Championship Game, February 7

Sources

Caribbean Series
Caribbean
2013 in Caribbean sport
International baseball competitions hosted by Mexico
Caribbean Series
Sport in Hermosillo